Ferdinand Gerz (born 17 November 1988 in Munich) is a German sailor, who specialized in two-person dinghy (470) class. He represented Germany, along with his partner Patrick Follmann, in the men's 470 class at the 2012 Summer Olympics, and has also been training throughout most of his sporting career at Deutscher Touring Yacht Club in Tutzing.

Career 
He also obtained a career best result with a single victory for the German squad at the 2012 Kieler Woche Tournament in Kiel. As of September 2014, Gerz is ranked no. 13 in the world for two-person dinghy class by the International Sailing Federation. Coming from a sporting pedigree, Gerz is the son of legendary sailor and 1983 world champion, Wolfgang Gerz, who finished fifth under the former West German sailing team in the Finn class at the 1984 Summer Olympics in Los Angeles.

Gerz qualified as a crew member for the German squad in the men's 470 class at the 2012 Summer Olympics in London by placing fifteenth and receiving a berth from the ISAF World Championships in Perth, Western Australia. Teaming with skipper Patrick Follmann in the opening series, the German duo recorded a score of 105 net points to establish a thirteenth-place finish in a fleet of twenty-seven boats.

References

External links
 
 
 
 
 
 

1988 births
Living people
German male sailors (sport)
Olympic sailors of Germany
Sailors at the 2012 Summer Olympics – 470
Sportspeople from Munich
Sailors at the 2016 Summer Olympics – 470